Oklahoma is the 37th-richest state in the United States, with a per capita income of $32,210 in 2006 and the third fastest-growing per capita income in the United States. Oklahoma also has one of the lowest costs of living in the United States, making its relative per capita income levels much higher than its ranking among states.

Oklahoma counties ranked by per capita income

Note: Data is from the 2010 United States Census Data and the 2006-2010 American Community Survey 5-Year Estimates.

Notes

United States locations by per capita income
Economy of Oklahoma
Income